Mudville may refer to:

 Mudville, a fictional town in the poem Casey at the Bat
 Stockton Ports, renamed Mudville Nine from 2000–2002
 Visalia Rawhide, a minor league baseball team in California that plays one game each season as the Mudville Nine
 Mudville (band), a post-trip-hop band from New York City
 Mudville, Holliston, Massachusetts

See also
 Midville (disambiguation)